Jeon Hye-jin is a Korean name consisting of the family name Jeon and the given name Hye-jin, and may also refer to:

 Jeon Hye-jin (actress, born 1970) (born 1970), South Korean actress
 Jeon Hye-jin (actress, born 1976) (born 1976), South Korean actress
 Jeon Hye-jin (actress, born 1988) (born 1988), South Korean actress